Arena is a 1976 Australian mini series about a lawyer who represents sportsmen.

References

External links
Arena at IMDb

1970s Australian television miniseries
1976 Australian television series debuts
1976 Australian television series endings